Air Force Museum may refer to:

Asia
 Air Force Museum of New Zealand in Wigram Aerodrome, Christchurch, New Zealand
 Indian Air Force Museum, Palam
 Republic of China Air Force Museum in Kaohsiung, Taiwan
 Sri Lanka Air Force Museum in Sri Lanka
 Vietnamese People's Air Force Museum, Hanoi in Vietnam
 Vietnamese People's Air Force Museum, Saigon in Vietnam

Other locations
 Comox Air Force Museum in Comox, British Columbia, Canada
 Italian Air Force Museum in Vigna di Valle, Italy
 Royal Air Force Museum in Colindale in north London and at RAF Cosford in Shropshire, England 
 South African Air Force Museum in South Africa

See also
 National Museum of the United States Air Force in Wright-Patterson Air Force Base, near Dayton, Ohio, US